Victoria Clamp is an American musician, best known as a vocalist in Tom Tom Club, led by Chris Frantz and Tina Weymouth. She is also the lead singer of the band BlondeStreak.

References

External links
 BlondeStreak - Victoria
 Tom Tom Club - Timeline

Living people
Tom Tom Club members
American women singers
Women new wave singers
Year of birth missing (living people)
21st-century American women